Christopher J. Waller is an American economist who is a member of the Federal Reserve Board of Governors since 2020. A nominee of then-President Donald Trump, he was confirmed by the Senate in December 2020, to serve through January 2030.

He was previously the research director of and an executive vice president at the Federal Reserve Bank of St. Louis. Waller's research has centered on monetary theory, political economy, and macroeconomic theory.

Early life and education 
Waller received a B.S. in economics from Bemidji State University in 1981, and a M.A. and Ph.D. from Washington State University in 1984 and 1985.

Career 

Waller worked at the Indiana University's Department of Economics from 1985 to 1998, where he was an associate professor, assistant professor and director of graduate studies. He was a visiting scholar at the Federal Reserve Bank of St. Louis and Washington University in St. Louis from 1994 to 1995. He taught economics at the University of Kentucky from 1998 to 2003 and was also a research fellow at the Center for European Integration Studies at the University of Bonn, in Germany. He was a chair of economics at the University of Notre Dame through 2009.

Waller joined the Federal Reserve Bank of St. Louis as research director in 2009. He was also executive vice president there.

In July 2019, President Donald Trump tweeted his intent to nominate Waller and Judy Shelton to serve on the Federal Reserve Board of Governors.

After hearings in February 2020, the Senate Banking Committee voted 18–7 in July 2020 to advance Waller's Fed nomination. He was confirmed in the Senate on December 3, 2020, by a vote of 48–47. He took the oath of office remotely via videoconference on December 18 from Fed Chair Jerome Powell. His term ends January 31, 2030.

Views 
Waller is known to be a monetary policy "dove", favoring expansionary policy and low interest rates. He has worked closely with the St. Louis Federal Reserve bank's president, James B. Bullard, who was a vocal supporter of lower interest rates in 2019. Waller has argued that the Fed should not raise rates at that time (in 2019), when inflation was low and private savings were high.

Waller's research has centered on monetary theory, political economy and macroeconomic theory.

See also 
 Federal Reserve
 Monetary policy

References 

1959 births
Living people
Bemidji State University alumni
Federal Reserve Bank people
Federal Reserve System governors
University of Kentucky faculty
University of Notre Dame faculty
Washington State University alumni
Washington University in St. Louis faculty